Historic Overtown / Lyric Theatre station is a station on the Metrorail rapid transit system in northwest Downtown, Miami, Florida. The station is located at the intersection of Northwest Sixth Street and First Avenue, just south of the neighborhood of Overtown and east of the historic Lyric Theatre. It opened on May 20, 1984.  Originally called Overtown, the Arena was added to the name in 1988 when the Miami Arena opened.  It took on its current name in 2007, one year before the Miami Arena was demolished. This station is within walking distance to MiamiCentral, which serves Brightline.

Station layout
The station has two tracks served by an island platform.

Places of interest
Miami-Dade Arena
Lyric Theatre
Ninth Street Pedestrian Mall
Park West District
Northern Downtown Miami

References

External links

MDT – Metrorail Stations
1st Court entrance from Google Maps Street View

Brickell Loop
Inner Loop
Omni Loop
Metrorail (Miami-Dade County) stations in Miami
Railway stations in the United States opened in 1984
1984 establishments in Florida